The House of Soviets is an unfinished building in the center of the city of Kaliningrad in the Kaliningrad Oblast, an exclave of Russia. The local people often refer to it as the "buried robot" because its appearance resembles the head of a giant robot buried in the ground up to the shoulders. Intended as the central administration building of the oblast, it was built on the original site of the 13th century Königsberg Castle.

Location 
The building is located in the central square of Kaliningrad, at the intersection of Shevchenko and Leninski Avenues. Although it is widely claimed that the House of Soviets was built directly on top of the site of Königsberg Castle, it stands to the east, on the site of the castle's moat.

History 
Königsberg Castle was severely damaged during the bombing of Königsberg in World War II. The city came under the control of the USSR after the war and the Soviet authorities opted not to preserve the ruins of the castle, saying it was a centre of fascism. What remained of the castle was blown up and cleared away between 1967 and 1969.

The vision for the redevelopment was heavily influenced by works of Lúcio Costa and Oscar Niemeyer, specifically the development of the Brazilian city of Brasília. Two architectural competitions were held for the redevelopment of the area, in 1964 and 1974, which included design firms from Moscow and Leningrad and from the then Soviet republics of Lithuania, Latvia and Estonia. The design chosen was by Yulian Lvovich Shvartsbreim, a winner of the USSR State Prize and well respected in Soviet Russia, and his studio TsNIIEP.

Construction started in 1970 on what was intended to be the central administration building of the Kaliningrad Oblast. The heavy concrete structure was placed on top of ruins, causing structural problems that were exacerbated by the marshy underlying soil. The foundations proved to be inadequate to support the original 28-story plan and only 21 stories were completed. Development was stopped in 1985 after the regional Party Committee lost interest in the project and ran out of funding. In 1992 there was an attempt to complete construction with Danish funding, but it was abandoned, and the building remained unfinished. People have broken in and painted graffiti inside and out.

In 2005, for Kaliningrad's 60th and Königsberg's 750th anniversary, also marked by a visit by Russian President Vladimir Putin, the exterior was painted light blue and windows were installed. The new color diminished the sense of brooding mass, but some criticized the update as a modern Potemkin façade. The interior remained unfinished and unusable.

In the 2010s, a German consultant recommended tearing down the entire structure and building anew as cheaper and safer than attempting to repair and finish the existing shell. A proposal was made to recreate the castle in a modified form as a tourist attraction, as part of the Heart of the City project, which originally envisaged rebuilding the House of Soviets as a hotel and conference center. While some consider the building to be one of the worst examples of post-war Soviet architecture, the House of Soviets was seen by others as an important work of Brutalist architecture, particularly before its pastel paint job.

Demolition of the building was announced on 12 November 2020, and was then expected to begin in early 2021. Fragments of the torn-down building might be given away or sold as souvenirs. Its redevelopment is part of the projected Heart of the City project to replace the former castle site and its surroundings with a multi-purpose city center development.

See also 
Ryugyong Hotel, unfinished project in Pyongyang, North Korea

References 

Buildings and structures in Kaliningrad
Buildings and structures built in the Soviet Union
Architecture in the Soviet Union
Unfinished buildings and structures
Brutalist architecture